The 2008 Individual Speedway Polish Championship (IMP) is the 2008 version of Individual Speedway Polish Championship organized by the Polish Motor Union (PZM).

The Final took place on August 9, 2008 in Leszno. Last time Final was took in Leszno in 1989 Polish speedway season when Wojciech Załuski beat Jan Krzystyniak and Tomasz Gollob. Defending Champion Rune Holta (Gorzów Wlkp.) was 12th. First time Individual Polish Championship was won by Adam Skórnicki (Poznań, former Leszno's rider) who beat former permanent Grand Prix riders Jarosław Hampel (Leszno) and Grzegorz Walasek (Zielona Góra). Tomasz Gollob (Gorzów Wlkp.) who won Polish Championship 7 time was 4th.

Calendar

Quarter-finals

Semi-finals

Final 
Final
9 August 2008 (7:30)
 Leszno, Alfred Smoczyk Stadium
Referee: Leszek Demski (Ostrów Wlkp.)
Attendance: 15,000
Beat Time: 59.64 - Jarosław Hampel in Heat 10
(4) Adrian Miedziński (TOR) → Janusz Kołodziej
(16) Piotr Świderski (RYB) → Damian Baliński

References

See also 
 2008 Team Speedway Polish Championship (2008 Speedway Ekstraliga)

2008
Individual